Othman Abdullah (13 March 1945 – 31 January 2015) was a Malaysian footballer. He competed in the men's tournament at the 1972 Summer Olympics. He also playing all three group games.

In 2004, he was inducted in Olympic Council of Malaysia's Hall of Fame for 1972 Summer Olympics football team.

References

External links
 

1945 births
2015 deaths
Malaysian footballers
Malaysia international footballers
Olympic footballers of Malaysia
Footballers at the 1972 Summer Olympics
Place of birth missing
Association football defenders